The decade of the 1010s involved some significant events in art.

Works
 c.1015: Bernward Doors (cast bronze)

Births
 1019: Wen Tong – Chinese Northern Song painter famous for his ink bamboo paintings (died 1079)
 1012: Cai Xiang – Chinese calligrapher, scholar, and poet (died 1067)

Art
Years of the 11th century in art